The Ministry of Agriculture, Food and Rural Affairs (OMAFRA) is an Ontario government ministry responsible for the food, agriculture and rural sectors of the Canadian province of Ontario. The Minister is currently Lisa Thompson.

The Ministry helps to build a stronger agri-food sector by investing in the development and transfer of innovative technologies, retaining and attracting investment, developing markets, providing regulatory oversight, and providing effective risk management tools.

Ministry mandate
The Ministry of Agriculture, Food and Rural Affairs works to advance government efforts to promote a competitive and productive agri-food sector and to provide economic growth and opportunities in rural Ontario.  The mandate of the Ministry is set by the Premier of Ontario and conveyed to the Minister of Agriculture, Food and Rural Affairs through a mandate letter.  The mandate letter for 2014-2015 contains the following priorities:
 Supporting the growth of the agri-food sector
 Ensuring sustainability of agriculture
 Providing business supports to farmers
 Expanding agriculture in the north
 Fostering vibrant rural economies

Foodland Ontario
Foodland Ontario, founded in 1977, is a consumer promotion program for the government of Ontario. Foodland Ontario currently falls under the administration of the Ministry of Agriculture, Food, and Rural Affairs in Ontario.  Through market research, advertising campaigns, working with local farmers and reaching out to retail locations, Foodland Ontario's mission is to "spread the word about the great taste, nutrition and economic benefits of buying Ontario food to all people in Ontario".

According to the Ministry, Foodland Ontario commercials such as the "Good things grow in Ontario" campaign reach more than 90% of the target audience including television, radio, billboard and print media campaigns.  Food retailers such as grocery stores and farmer's markets display the logo to promote Ontario foods and capture niche markets for products such as health food.  In 2011-12, over 700,000 copies of Foodland calendars and 250,000 copies of two Foodland cookbooks were distributed across the province.

Ministry agencies

The Ministry is responsible for the following agencies:

 Agricorp
 Agricultural Research Institute of Ontario
 Agriculture, Food and Rural Affairs Appeal Tribunal
 Board of Negotiation
 Business Risk Management Review Committee
 Canadian National Exhibition Association 
 Council of the College of Veterinarians of Ontario
 Grain Financial Protection Board
 Livestock Financial Protection Board
 Livestock Medicines Advisory Committee
 Normal Farm Practices Protection Board
 Ontario Agristability Review Committee
 Ontario Farm Products Marketing Commission
 Ontario Food Terminal Board
 Rural Economic Development Advisory Panel

Organization history
Prior to confederation, the Bureau of Agriculture of the Province of Canada was responsible for collecting facts and statistics relating to the agricultural, mechanical and manufacturing interests.

Under the terms of the British North America Act of 1867, the Lieutenant Governor of Ontario was empowered to appoint, as one of the executive officers of the government, a Commissioner of Agriculture and Public Works.
 
On March 4, 1868, the Act for the Encouragement of Agriculture, Horticulture, Arts, and Manufactures received royal assent, establishing the Department of the Commissioner of Agriculture and Public Works. The Commissioner was referred to simply as the Commissioner of Agriculture and Arts when dealing with matters relating to arts and agriculture, and as the Commissioner of Public Works, when dealing with matters relating to public works. However, a separate Department of Public Works was established in 1869, taking over the public works functions. However, one individual continued to be commissioner for both portfolios until 1874.

The agricultural and arts functions of the department were carried out by the Commissioner through the Bureau of Agriculture and Arts. "Arts", at the time, referred to the practical application of an industrial, manufacturing, or scientific pursuit, rather than to its current meaning. Additionally, a variety of both agricultural and arts-related agencies were required to report to the commissioner, and to provide statistical information to the bureau. The department also had responsibility over immigration between 1869 and 1874. In 1874, a separate Commissioner for the Department of Public Works was created.

In 1877, the Department of the Commissioner of Agriculture and Arts was formally established. The Commissioner acted as head of the Bureau of Agriculture and Arts from 1877 until 1882, as well as the Bureau of Industries, which replaced the Bureau of Agriculture and Arts, from 1882 until 1888.

In 1880, the "arts" related responsibilities of the Commissioner, and the bureau, were transferred to the Department of Education. The name of the department, however, remained the Department of the Commissioner of Agriculture and Arts until 1888.

In 1888, the department was renamed the Department of Agriculture. With this change, the head of the department was renamed to the Minister of Agriculture, with cabinet standing.  Prior to the First World War, the department were responsible for a wide range of functions including the Office of the Registrar General (until 1891); the Clerk of Forestry (until 1895); the Inspector of Factories (until 1915); the Inspector of Mines (until 1891); and the Provincial Inspector in Road-making (until 1900). After the First World War, the department's function became increasingly more focused in the regulation and promotion of agricultural activities. The department was briefly responsible for telephone services between 1960 and 1971.

In 1966, the department was renamed the Department of Agriculture and Food. By this time, rural development has emerged distinctly as an area of focus. With the reorganization of the government in 1972, the department was renamed the Ministry of Agriculture and Food. In 1994, the Ministry of Agriculture and Food was renamed the Ministry of Agriculture, Food and Rural Affairs.

List of Ministers

References

Notes

Citations

Further reading

External links
 

1888 establishments in Ontario
Government agencies established in 1888
Agriculture and Food
Ontario